Lake Linville is a  reservoir in Rockcastle County, Kentucky. It was created in 1968 by the construction of the earthen Renfro Dam, 72 feet high with a length of 1100 feet, owned and operated by the Commonwealth of Kentucky.  The dam is a highway fill embankment along Interstate 75.

Facilities
Facilities include a launching ramp, boat dock, campground, splash pad and parking area. Boats, live bait, and tackle are available.

Fishery
Species in the lake include largemouth bass, smallmouth bass, spotted bass, white crappie, hybrid bass, channel catfish, bluegill, longear sunfish, carp, and yellow bullhead.

References

External links
 Kentucky Department of Fish and Wildlife Resources

Linville
Linville
Protected areas of Rockcastle County, Kentucky
Bodies of water of Rockcastle County, Kentucky